The 1969–70 Jacksonville Dolphins men's basketball team represented Jacksonville University during the 1969–70 NCAA University Division basketball season. The independent Dolphins were led by sixth-year head coach Joe Williams and played their home games at the Jacksonville Coliseum.  

In the Mideast regional, they defeated Western Kentucky, No. 7 Iowa, and No. 1 Kentucky to advance to the Final Four; through 2021, it remains the program's only trip. The Dolphins defeated No. 3 St. Bonaventure to advance to the national championship game against second-ranked UCLA; the Bruins won their fourth straight NCAA title, and Jacksonville ended the season at  overall.

Previous season

Season summary 
The Dolphins were led by  center Artis Gilmore. A two-time All-America honoree (in 1969–70 and 1970–71), Gilmore led the nation in rebounding both seasons. He finished his career with 1,312 points (24.3 average) and 1,224 rebounds (22.7).

The game against Georgetown on December 18 was stopped with 1:23 remaining in the first half following successive brawls between players from both teams and fans. Georgetown head coach Jack Magee pulled his team from the court and Jacksonville was awarded the win.

The Dolphins lost the national championship game to UCLA despite taking an early lead. UCLA narrowed the lead and took over with 1:20 left in the first half. The Bruins never trailed again as they pulled away for the 80–69 win.

Roster

Source

Schedule and results

|-
!colspan=12 style=| Regular season

|-
!colspan=12 style=| NCAA Tournament

Rankings

Awards and honors
Artis Gilmore – Second-Team All-American, AP, NABC and UPI

Team players in the 1970 NBA Draft

References

Jacksonville
Jacksonville Dolphins men's basketball seasons
NCAA Division I men's basketball tournament Final Four seasons
Jacksonville